Studies in Classic American Literature is a work of literary criticism by the English writer D. H. Lawrence. It was first published by Thomas Seltzer in the United States in August 1923. The British edition was published in June 1924 by Martin Secker.

The authors discussed include Benjamin Franklin, Hector St. John de Crevecoeur, James Fenimore Cooper, Edgar Allan Poe, Nathaniel Hawthorne, Richard Henry Dana, Jr., Herman Melville, and Walt Whitman.

Reception
Edmund Wilson described Studies in Classic American Literature as "one of the few first-rate books that have ever been written on the subject" despite "shots that do not hit the mark and moments that are quite hysterical." The critic Harold Bloom listed Studies in Classic American Literature in his The Western Canon (1994) as one of the books that have been important and influential in Western culture. Lawrence's work is generally credited with contributing to the restoration of Herman Melville as a seminal figure in American literature.

Standard editions 
 Studies in Classic American Literature (1923), edited by Ezra Greenspan, Lindeth Vasey and John Worthen, Cambridge University Press, 2002,

References

External links

 Studies in Classic American Literature from American Studies at the University of Virginia.

1923 non-fiction books
Books by D. H. Lawrence
Books of literary criticism